FCK ended second in the Danish Superliga in the season 2004-05.

They won on May 26 the Royal League again, after an exciting final against IFK Göteborg, which were decided in a penalty shootout.

FCK were knocked out of the UEFA Champions League by ND Gorica on August 4 after an embarrassing defeat on 5-0 home after FCK won 2-1 away.

Squad
The following squads, are lists with all the players, who have played in F.C. Copenhagen in the 2004-05 season.

Competition statistics

Danish Superliga

Classification

Results summary

Results
Results for F.C. Copenhagen for season 2004-2005.

NOTE: scores are written FCK first

Key:
DSL = Danish Superliga
DC = Danish Cup
CLQ = UEFA Champions League Qualifier
RLB = Royal League Group B
RL1 = Royal League Group 1
RLF = Royal League Final
LMC = La Manga Cup
F = Friendly match

Top goalscorers
Note! Only official matches!

See also
2004–05 Danish Superliga
2004–05 UEFA Champions League
2004–05 Royal League

References

F.C. Copenhagen seasons
Copenhagen